Koko Komégné is a visual artist based in Douala and a promoter of the contemporary art scene in Cameroon.

Life and career 

Koko Komégné was born in 1950 in Batoufam. In 1956 he moves to Yaoundé where he attends school and he starts drawing and listening to all sorts of musics. In 1960–62 he produces his first sculpture Le Boxeur and in 1965, after many ups and downs, he moves to Douala where he meets Jean Sabatier, an amateur painter who will draw him to paint. In 1966 Komégné opens his first atelier: as a training, he starts reproducing art works by major painters (Van Gogh, Picasso, etc.) and for living he makes advertising billboards. In 1968 he wins the drawing competition Biscuits Berlin and he works for one year on a little boat which navigates the coasts of Central Africa. In 1971 he participates to his first group show organised in Douala by the Association Française pour la Formation des Cadres. In 1972 he opens a bar next to his house where he invites musicians and where he plays as percussionist and singer; in little time he becomes the singer of the music group "Black Power". In 1986 he decides to concentrate on painting: he moves to a quieter neighbourhood and he gets married. In 1990 he gets married for the second time and he has a daughter to whom he later dedicates the exhibition "Evanescence" in 2008 at the Espace Doual'art. After another divorce, he gets married for the third time and he has four children. In 1997 he's victim of an accident and he stays in hospital for four months.
In 2000 he has to leave his atelier in the neighbourhood of Bonadibong in Douala and he moves to the neighbourhood CCC.

After signing his paintings "Komégné Gaston", "Koko Décor", "Gaston Komé", he chooses to sign his paintings with the name Koko Komégné, a combination of his father's name (Kouamo) and his name (Komégné). In his personal work, he concentrates on music, dance, prostitutes, poverty, nightlife and masks. In 1974 he produced the scene painting of the film Pousse Pousse by Daniel Kamga, the first Cameroonian film and in 1976 he has his first solo show at Quartier Latin, a restaurant club in Douala. In 1979 he participates in the first competition for young Cameroonian painters. In 2005 DUTA, the first edition of the Biennale of Douala, devotes a tribute to Koko Komégné and in 2006 Doual'art organises the wide solo shop Koko Komégné: 40 ans de peinture curated by Didier Schaub.

In 1985 he decorates the club Black et White in Limbe and the Hotel Arcade in Douala; in 1986 the Cabaret le Vieux Négre in Douala and in 1987 the Mountain Hotel in Buéa and the University Centre in Dschang; in 1989 the Hotel Hilton in Yaoundé decorates his rooms with lithographs by Koko Komégné; in 1993 he decorates the Phaco Club International and the Restaurant Parfait Garden in Douala; in 1994 the Central Hotel in Yaoundé; in 1995 the Hotel Méridien in Douala commissions him a series of 11 frescos which will be distracted after the hotel changes management. In 2002 he makes frescos for the new building of the assurance company La Citoyenne in Douala and in 2003 the Hotel Sofitel Mont Fébé in Yaoundé decorates his 90 rooms with lithographs by Komégné.

In 1992 he participates in Art Venture, a workshop organised by the cultural organisation Doual'art which produces a fresco: a triptych 4.5m long by 1.5m high in plexiglas installed in Dakar Square in Douala. In 1993 he is the artistic director of Doual'art Pop '93, a workshop organised by Doual'art in the neighbourhood of Madagascar in Douala in which 25 artists produced frescos on stockades of a building yard; in the same year he participates in Cadavres exquis at the Mbappé Leppé Stadium in Douala and he is committee member of the Festival National des Arts et de la Culture. In 1997 he participates in Le Kwatt, a workshop organised by Doual'art in the neighbourhood Makepe Petit-Pays in Douala and in 1998 in Entr'Artistes curated by Mariela Borello at Doual'art. In March 2007 he participates in the Ars et Urbis International Workshop and in December in the SUD-Salon Urbain de Douala.

In 1994 he exhibits in Kwanza Holiday Black Expo in New York; in 1995 in the Ottakringer Museum in Austria. In 1997 he participates in the workshop Daro Daro in Abidjan, Ivory Coast and in 2003 in the group show Cameroon Connexion, curated by Yann Quennec in the gallery Pravda in Paris.

Koko Komégné promotes art and artists in Cameroon: he participates to over 500 radio programmes, 100 TV programmes and 500 interviews on newspapers and magazines. In 1979 he creates the first association of artists of Cameroon Cercle Maduta ("meduta" means "images" in the Douala language) with the artists Viking Kanganyam, Jean-Guy Atakoua and Samuel Abélé. Cercle Maduta closes in 1983 when Koko Komégné founds with other artists the CAPLIT – Cercle des Artistes Plasticiens du Littoral. In 1980 ha exhibits in Menuiserie ETD MUCAM Meubles, a furniture shop; in 1981 he has his first retrospective show (1976–1982) at the American Cultural Centre and in 1982 at the French Cultural Centre in Yaoundé.
He is founding member in 1994 of the cultural association Kheops Club which brings together ten Cemroonian artists with the aim of promoting visual arts in Cameroon. In 1995 he is the artistic director of the workshop UPEMBA. In 1995 he presents the young artists Joël Mpah Dooh, Blaise Bang, Salifou Lindou, Hervé Youmbi and Hervé Yamguen inside the exhibition "Tele Miso" at the MAM Gallery in Douala. In 2001 he is curator of the group show Yann & Co at the Atelier Viking and of Squatt'art, a one-week workshop and show with 22 artists open air in the neighbourhood Bali in Douala. In 2002 he participates in Squatt'art II in the neighbourhood Deïdo in Douala. He is also one of the founding member of the artist-run art space Art Wash.

Bibliography 
 "Revue Noire" – Special Issue on Cameroon, n. 13, 1994
 KOKO KOMEGNE: 40 ans de peinture
 Koko Komégné talks about his impressions about the city of Douala https://www.youtube.com/watch?v=-dVempw0XIM
 Interview to Koko Komégné by Yvonne Monkam in Africultures, 2006
 Film Loobhy, by G. Fontana, Simon Njami et P.M. Tayou, 1997 distributed on the TV channel "Arte" in 1998.
 Artevents. Koko Komegne: Exposition sweet logik, 1966 – 2016. http://arteventscm.over-blog.com/2016/02/koko-komegne-exposition-sweet-logik-1966-2016.html
 Cornier, T. (1993). Le bruit du silence. film, production CCF Douala
 Mayagw, M.N. (2009): Vernissage: Koko Komégné va «crescendo. Camerfeeling. http://www.camerfeeling.fr.fo/dossiers/dossier.php?val=3479_
 Monkam, Y. (2006). Koko Komégné féte quarante années d’arts plastiques. Africultureles. Available at: http://www.africultures.com/php/?nav=article&no=4547
 Pensa, Iolanda (Ed.) 2017. Public Art in Africa. Art et transformations urbaines à Douala /// Art and Urban Transformations in Douala. Genève: Metis Presses.

External links 

1950 births
Cameroonian artists
Living people